Ahmed Assid (born July 14, 1961) is a Moroccan Berber activist, a professor of philosophy, a poet, and a political activist, well known for being an active secularist.

Assid is a secularist, and is well known for his criticism of Muslim fundamentalists and Arabization. In 2013, Assid received death threats several times, and three years later he was on the black list of ISIS and their main target among Moroccan figures.

In 1980, he continued his higher education in Rabat in the Department of Philosophy and Sociology. He graduated from the Faculty of Education Sciences as a Professor of Philosophy in 1988.

References

1961 births
Living people
Berber activists
Berber poets
Critics of Islam
Critics of Islamism
Moroccan activists
Moroccan secularists
People from Taroudannt
Shilha people